Goldie Goldbloom (born 1964) is a Chassidic Australian novelist, essayist and short story writer. 
She is an LGBT activist and a former board member of Eshel.

Early life and education

Goldbloom was born in Perth, Western Australia. She is a graduate of theological seminaries in Australia and the United States, and earned an MFA in creative writing from Warren Wilson College. She is a member of the Lubavitch chassidic community. Goldbloom is the mother of eight children. Her grandmother was the West Australian writer Dorrit Hunt, who was made a Life Member of the Fellowship of Australian Writers in 1988.

Career 

Goldbloom began writing fiction seriously in her forties, after the birth of her eight children, and in 2011, received the Simon Blattner Fellowship in Creative Writing and World Literature from Northwestern University, following the publication of her novel, The Paperbark Shoe. She then began teaching at Northwestern University and the University of Chicago.
Goldbloom's work has been published in Ploughshares, The Kenyon Review, Prairie Schooner, Narrative, Le Monde and Story Quarterly, among other places. In 2015, her story "The Pilgrim's Way" was selected for inclusion in the Best Australian Short Stories. She was an early contributor to G-dcast, and has written for NPR. Her fiction and creative nonfiction have been selected for Keep Your Wives Away From Them (Golden Crown Literary Award, 2011), Inspired Journeys and over a dozen other anthologies.

Her novel The Paperbark Shoe won the Association of Writers and Writing Programs Award for Fiction in 2008 and was placed on the National Endowment for the Arts "Big Read" list in 2018. The novel won the Literary Novel of the Year from the ForeWord Magazine (Independent Publishers) in 2011. Goldie received a Great Lakes College Association New Writers Award  in 2010. In 2011, Goldbloom was the Chicago Reader’s Jewish Writer of the Year.

In 2013, she spoke at the International Forum on the Novel, run by Villa Gillet in Lyon, France, on the subject of "Portraits and Faces: Appearance and Disfigurement". Later the same year, she was awarded a National Endowment for the Arts Fellowship in Creative Writing.

Her novel, Gwen, was a finalist for the Aurealis Prize in fantasy fiction, the Most Underrated Book Award and the Australian Literary Society's Gold Medal in 2018.

Goldbloom received a Brown Foundation Fellowship at Dora Maar House in Menerbes, France, in 2014 and won Hunger Mountain's National Nonfiction Award in the same year. In 2016, the City of Chicago awarded her an Individual Artist Grant and in 2017, Yaddo and Ragdale selected her for artist's residencies.

Her third novel, On Division, was awarded the Association of Jewish Libraries' Book of the Year prize for 2020. It was also chosen as the San Francisco One Bay One Book selection for 2019–20
and the 2020 Prix des Libraires. The novel was shortlisted for the 2021 Wingate Prize.

Bibliography 
(2019) On Division
(2017) Gwen
(2011) You Lose These and other stories
(2009) The Paperbark Shoe (novel) – winner of the AWP Novel Award

Awards and honors 
(1981) Jerusalem Post International Fiction Prize
(2008) AWP Novel Award, The Paperbark Shoe
(2011) Great Lakes College Association New Writers Award, The Paperbark Shoe
(2011) IndieFab Novel of the Year, The Paperbark Shoe
(2014) Hunger Mountain Nonfiction Award, "The Chevra"
(2014) National Endowment for the Arts Fellowship
(2015) Best Australian Short Story, "The Pilgrim's Way"
(2018) Most Underrated Book Award (shortlist), Gwen
(2018) Aurealis Prize in Fantasy Fiction (shortlist), Gwen
(2018) Australian Literary Society Gold Medal (longlist),Gwen
(2018) National Endowment for the Arts "Big Read" list, The Paperbark Shoe
(2019) San Francisco One Bay One Book selection, 2019–2020, On Division
(2020) Association of Jewish Libraries Book of the Year, On Division
(2021) Wingate Prize (Shortlist) On Division
(2021) Laureat du Prix des Libraires 2021 On Division

References

External links 

Washington Post Review of The Paperbark Shoe (2011) .
Chicago Tribune Interview with Goldie Goldbloom (2011) http://www.chicagotribune.com/entertainment/books/ct-books-0430-goldie-goldbloom-20110429,0,474752.story
 ABC Radio Australia Interview with Goldbloom (2017) http://www.abc.net.au/radionational/programs/booksandarts/gwen:-a-fictional-biography-of-gwen-john/8486964
 "The Hairpin" Interview about LGBT Jews in the Orthodox community (2014) https://www.thehairpin.com/2014/12/love-your-neighbor-an-interview-with-goldie-goldbloom/
 NEA Interview with Goldie Goldbloom (2018) https://www.arts.gov/art-works/2018/nea-big-read-author-goldie-goldbloom-bullying-writing-bathtub-and-books
The Economist interview (2019) https://www.economist.com/books-and-arts/2019/09/26/the-strictures-and-allure-of-ultra-orthodox-life

1964 births
Living people
Australian LGBT rights activists
Jewish Australian writers
Writers from Perth, Western Australia